Titiqaqa (Quechua titi lead, lead colored, qaqa rock, other spellings Teteqaqa, Teteq'aq'a) is an archaeological site in Peru. It is located in the Cusco Region, Cusco Province, Cusco District, in the northeast of Cusco.

References

Archaeological sites in Peru
Archaeological sites in Cusco Region